Yangzhou Subdistrict is a subdistrict in Yang County, Shaanxi, China. , it has nine residential communities and 10 villages under its administration.

See also 
 List of township-level divisions of Shaanxi

References 

Township-level divisions of Shaanxi
Yang County